Meomi Design Inc is a Canadian/American design studio based in Vancouver and Los Angeles founded by Vicki Wong and Michael C. Murphy in 2002. Their works include the Vancouver 2010 Winter Olympics mascots Miga, Quatchi, Sumi and Mukmuk, and Octonauts, a series of books which were made into a CGI Animated TV series for the BBC channel CBeebies by Brown Bag Films (Which the new animation studio is Mainframe Studios) and Silvergate Media in 2010, subsequently broadcast internationally.

The books also received their own cartoon series.

Creations by Meomi Design

1. Ciao

Created August 14, 2006

Nationality: American

MixMax

Created: March 23 2005

Nationality: Italian, Brazilian, American

2. Miga, Quatchi, Sumi and Mukmuk from the Vancouver 2010 Olympics

Created: November 27 2007

Nationality: Canadian

3. The Octonauts

Created: March 30 2008

Nationality: British

4. Karen and Boopkins

Created: January 23 2011

Nationality: American and Canadian

5. White is Menacing

Created March 13, 2015

Nationality: American

6. Pow The Fox

Created: October 26 2020

Nationality: American , and Canadian

7. Play:Time

Created: October 30 2020

Nationality: Canadian

8. Francis Guetta

Created: September 7 2021

Nationality: British and Canadian

References

External links
 

Canadian designers
American designers